Brewton (also spelled Bruton) is an unincorporated community in Laurens County, in the U.S. state of Georgia.

History
Variant names were "Bruton" and "Bruton Station". Brewton had its start in 1884 when the Wrightsville and Tennille Railroad was extended to that point. A post office called Brewton was established in 1894, and remained in operation until 1958. The community took its name from Bruton Creek (also known as Brewton Creek).  The Georgia General Assembly incorporated the place as the "Town of " in 1889. The town's charter was dissolved in 1995.

See also
Bruton and Pineora Railway

References

Former municipalities in Georgia (U.S. state)
Unincorporated communities in Laurens County, Georgia
Unincorporated communities in Georgia (U.S. state)
Populated places disestablished in 1995